The 4th Guards Brigade was an infantry brigade of the British Army. It was formed by battalions withdrawn from the Guards Division and served with the 31st Division on the Western Front during the First World War. It ended the war as General Headquarters Troops, before being broken up in the Guards Division on 17 November 1918.

History

Formation
In February 1918, British divisions on the Western Front were reduced from a 12-battalion to a 9-battalion basis (brigades from four to three battalions).  The 4th Guards Brigade was formed on 8 February 1918 by taking a battalion from each of the brigades of the Guards Division: the 3rd Battalion, Coldstream Guards from the 1st Guards Brigade, the 2nd Battalion, Irish Guards from the 2nd Guards Brigade and the 4th Battalion, Grenadier Guards from the 3rd Guards Brigade.  It joined the 31st Division at noon on the same day.

War service
The brigade replaced the 94th Brigade in 31st Division, temporarily taking over the 94th Machine Gun Company and the 94th Trench Mortar Battery of that brigade.  The 94th Machine Gun Company joined 31st Battalion, Machine Gun Corps (as C Company) on 3 March.  The 4th Guards Trench Mortar Battery was formed on 19 March, took over the Stokes mortars and 94th Trench Mortar Battery then disappeared.

The brigade remained with the division until 20 May and in that time saw considerable action in the Battle of the Lys in April, particularly the Battle of Estaires, Battle of Hazebrouck and the Defence of Nieppe Forest.  It was then withdrawn to GHQ Reserve of the British Expeditionary Force.

Post-war
At the Armistice, the brigade was still part of GHQ Reserve but serving as Corps Troops with the Cavalry Corps.  On 17 November, the brigade rejoined the Guards Division at Maubeuge.  The battalions rejoined their original brigades and the 4th Guards Brigade Headquarters and Trench Mortar Battery were disbanded.

Order of battle
The following units served in the brigade:
 4th Battalion, Grenadier Guards
 3rd Battalion, Coldstream Guards
 2nd Battalion, Irish Guards
 4th Guards Trench Mortar Battery

Commanders
The brigade had the following commanders:

See also

Notes

References

Bibliography

External links
 
 
 
 

Infantry brigades of the British Army in World War I
Guards Division (United Kingdom)
Military units and formations established in 1918
Military units and formations disestablished in 1918